The 1883 Penn Quakers football team represented the University of Pennsylvania in the 1883 college football season. They finished with a 6–2–1 record.

Schedule

References

Penn
Penn Quakers football seasons
Penn Quakers football